Marshal John Yanda (born September 15, 1984) is an American former football guard who played in the National Football League (NFL) for the Baltimore Ravens. He played college football at the University of Iowa, and was drafted by the Ravens in the third round of the 2007 NFL Draft and spent his entire 13-year career with the team.

With six consecutive Pro Bowl selections from 2011 to 2016 (the longest active streak amongst guards at the time) Yanda was widely considered to be among the best offensive linemen in football; he was also a unanimous selection to the NFL 2010s All-Decade Team. Yanda missed most of the 2017 season due to injury, but was elected to the Pro Bowl again in 2018 and 2019 before announcing his retirement in March 2020.

Early years
Yanda attended Anamosa High School in Iowa and was a letterman in football, basketball, and track & field. In football, he was a two-time first-team all-conference selection.

College career
Yanda played for the Iowa Hawkeyes football team while attending the University of Iowa, where he was an economics major.  He was selected as a third-team All-American by The NFL Draft Report in 2006 and earned second-team All-Big Ten honors from the league's coaches in recognition of his contributions on the field.  Yanda's first two college football seasons were played for North Iowa Area Community College.

Professional career

The Baltimore Ravens selected Yanda in the third round (86th overall) of the 2007 NFL Draft. Yanda was the seventh offensive tackle drafted in 2007.

On July 11, 2007, the Baltimore Ravens signed Yanda to a three-year, $1.61 million contract that includes $502,698 guaranteed.

During his rookie year in 2007, Yanda played all 16 games with 12 starts. In 2008, Yanda was limited to five starts. In 2009, Yanda played all 16 games with nine starts. In 2010, Yanda started all 16 games for the first time of his career. On July 26, 2011, the Ravens re-signed Yanda to a five-year, $32 million contract. In 2011, Yanda again started all 16 games and was chosen to represent the AFC in the 2011 Pro Bowl. In 2012, Yanda started 14 games and won his first championship ring as the Ravens won Super Bowl XLVII against the San Francisco 49ers. In the 2013 and 2014 seasons, Yanda played all 16 games each season.

On October 16, 2015, the Ravens signed Yanda to a four-year contract extension worth $32 million.

Yanda was consecutively named as the top-ranked guard by Pro Football Focus in 2014, 2015, and 2016. He was ranked 37th by his fellow players on the NFL Top 100 Players of 2016.

Yanda was named to his sixth straight Pro Bowl in recognition of his accomplishments in the 2016 season. He was also ranked 43rd by his peers on the NFL Top 100 Players of 2017.

Yanda broke his ankle during a game on September 17, 2017, which prematurely ended his season.

On December 18, 2018, Yanda was named to his seventh Pro Bowl after missing out last year, due to his injury. He was also named second-team All-Pro for the fourth time in his career after starting all 16 games.

On April 11, 2019, Yanda signed a one-year contract extension with the Ravens through the 2020 season.

On March 10, 2020, Yanda announced his retirement from the NFL after 13 seasons.

Personal life
Yanda married Shannon Hunt Yanda in 2011. The couple have three children: Graham, Libby, and Logan. They spend the NFL off-season in Marion, Iowa.

References

External links
Baltimore Ravens bio
Iowa Hawkeyes bio

1984 births
Living people
Sportspeople from Cedar Rapids, Iowa
American Conference Pro Bowl players
Unconferenced Pro Bowl players
American football offensive tackles
American football offensive guards
Iowa Hawkeyes football players
Players of American football from Iowa
Baltimore Ravens players
People from Anamosa, Iowa
Ed Block Courage Award recipients